Marzio Nessi (born 1957 in Muralto, Switzerland), is an experimental physicist with a focus on high-energy and high-intensity particle physics.

Nessi studied mathematics and physics at ETH Zurich (Switzerland) and obtained his Ph.D. degree there.  
Since 1989, he has been working at CERN. He is the coordinator of the CERN Neutrino Platform (CENF) and a titular professor in the physics department of the University of Geneva.

Biography and scientific career

Marzio Nessi received his undergraduate and graduate education at ETH Zurich, studying mathematics and physics. After obtaining his Ph.D. degree and a short period as a postdoc at ETH, working on medium energy physics and accelerator-based mass spectrometry, he moved to Rice University in Houston, USA. There, he changed the focus of his research towards experimental particle physics. During his time in the USA, Nessi participated in experiments at Brookhaven National Laboratory, Fermilab and CERN.

In 1989, he transferred to CERN as a research fellow, becoming a staff physicist soon after. Since then, he has been involved in different experiments. He took part in the UA2 experiment and was spokesman of the RD34 project.

Marzio Nessi contributed to the ATLAS experiment from its beginning on. He was project leader of the ATLAS tile calorimeter as well as overall technical coordinator, and served as ATLAS project manager from 2000 until 2013.

Since April 2014, he is the Scientific Director of the Journal of Instrumentation.

He is a titular professor in the physics department of the University of Geneva.

Marzio Nessi is general coordinator of the CERN Neutrino Platform (CENF), which was founded in 2012.

References

External links
 Link to Marzio Nessi's profile on INSPIRE-HEP

1957 births
Living people
People associated with CERN